Ron Fletcher (29 April 1927 – 19 September 2011) was an  Australian rules footballer who played with North Melbourne in the Victorian Football League (VFL).

Notes

External links 

1927 births
2011 deaths
Australian rules footballers from Victoria (Australia)
North Melbourne Football Club players